Alsatian may refer to:
 The Alsace region of France
 Alsatians (people), a person from the Alsace region of France or a speaker of the Alsatian language 
 Alsatian dialect, the language or dialect of the Alsace region of northeast France
 German Shepherd, a breed of dog also known as an Alsatian in the UK
 "Alsatian Cousin", the first track on Morrissey's 1988 debut album, Viva Hate

See also 
 Alsace (disambiguation)
 Elsässer (disambiguation)
 List of Alsatians

Language and nationality disambiguation pages